The Boy Who Knew Too Much may refer to:

 "The Boy Who Knew Too Much" (The Simpsons), a 1994 episode of The Simpsons
 The Boy Who Knew Too Much (album), a 2009 album by Mika

See also
 "The Man Who Grew Too Much", a 2014 episode of The Simpsons
 The Girl Who Knew Too Much (disambiguation)
 The Man Who Knew Too Much (disambiguation)